Albadilon da Silva Carvalho (born July 6, 1984), or simply Da Silva, is a Brazilian footballer

Contract
 Francisco Beltrao (Loan) 6 June 2007 to 6 September 2007
 Paraná 1 March 2003 to 31 December 2007

External links 
 
 
 

1984 births
Brazilian footballers
Living people
Paraná Clube players
Sportspeople from Londrina
Association football defenders